Korea Research Institute of Bioscience and Biotechnology (KRIBB) is a government research institute in Daejeon, South Korea. It is dedicated to biotechnology research across a broad span of expertise, from basic studies for the fundamental understanding of life phenomena to applied studies such as drug discovery, novel biomaterials, integrated biotechnology and bioinformation.

KRIBB was established in 1985. Its accomplishments include the advancement of welfare and medical technology, an increase in food production, a cleaner environment and new bio-materials and energy sources.

It has identified reasons for the failure of animal cloning, conducted a comparative study of chimpanzee genes and successfully analyzed the structure of the reactive oxygen species switch protein, which became the first study by Korean scholars to be published in Cell, an international scientific journal. The institute was ranked first in the discovery of new microorganisms, including the indigenous microorganisms of the Dokdo Islets, for four consecutive years.

Its recent accomplishments include the development of a genome capable of controlling cancer cell proliferation and the identification of a neuropeptide Y-based growth control mechanism, with possibilities for new treatments for cancer, diabetes, obesity and ageing. Nano–bio sensor research led to the development of the world's smallest surface plasmon resonance biochip.

History

Mission 

 Carry out R&D activities and related projects in bioscience and biotechnology with other research institutes, academic, and businesses at home and abroad
 Disseminate the results of its scientific research and technological development

Objectives 

 Research and development in bioscience and biotechnology and support for research projects
 Domestic and overseas cooperation among industry, academia and research institutes and distribution of the results

Key functions 

 Advanced R&D and development and distribution of generic technologies in bioscience and biotechnology
 Public infrastructure development support for research on bioscience at home and abroad

Facility 

 Headquarters (Human Gene Bank, Plant Extract Bank, KCTC): 
 Bio-Therapeutic Research Institute (Ochang Campus): 
 Bio-Materials Research Institute (Jeonbuk Campus):

External links 

 KRIBB website

Research institutes in South Korea
Multidisciplinary research institutes